Willebrand or Willebrands may refer to:
 Von Willebrand disease, a hereditary coagulation abnormality disease
 Von Willebrand factor, a blood glycoprotein involved in hemostasis
 Erik Adolf von Willebrand, a Finnish internist
 Julia Willebrand, an environmental, peace and education activist
 Johannes Willebrands, a Dutch Cardinal of the Roman Catholic Church